The Culan is a mountain of the Bernese Alps, overlooking the Col de la Croix in the Swiss canton of Vaud.

References

External links
 Culan on Hikr

Mountains of the Alps
Mountains of Switzerland
Mountains of the canton of Vaud